Rancon is a commune in the Haute-Vienne department in the Nouvelle-Aquitaine region in southwestern France.

History 

The earliest known name for Rancon is Roncomagus; which comes from the Gallic and means 'market at the rock'. And the piers for the old bridge over the River Gartempe - which still exists - date from the Gallo-Roman era. This bridge is believed to have carried an important Gallo-Roman road. 

The village also has a fortified church which featured in the Hundred Years War. As well as a 'Lantern of the dead' dating from the 12th century. The exact purpose of these lanterns is still a mystery.

There is also a Roman-style chapel outside the village, which houses a Gallo-Roman altar dedicated to Hercules. This chapel is open during the summer and was painted by English artists Fred Yates and Geoff Bunn both of whom lived in the area for a time.

Geography
The river Semme forms the commune's northern border.

The river Gartempe forms part of the commune's eastern border, flows westward through the middle of the commune, then forms part of the commune's western border.

Inhabitants are known as Ranconniers.

See also
 Communes of the Haute-Vienne department

References

Communes of Haute-Vienne
Lemovices